The mayor of Queenstown-Lakes in New Zealand presides over the Queenstown-Lakes District Council. The district council has existed since 1986 and there have been seven mayors so far.

Queenstown-Lakes District Council
In 1986, the Queenstown Borough Council merged with the Lake County to form Queenstown-Lakes District Council. The last mayor of Queenstown Borough, John Davies, was elected as the first mayor of Queenstown-Lakes District. In 1989, Arrowtown Borough Council amalgamated with Queenstown-Lakes District Council in the 1989 local government reforms.

Place names
Some streets and places in Queenstown are named after former borough council mayors; Robertson Street in Frankton, Hallenstein Street, Malaghan Road and Malaghan Street, Warren Park, Hotop Rise, Reid Street, St. Omer Park, Anderson Heights, Robins Road, Grant Road, and Davies Place.

References

 
Queenstown-Lakes